
Gmina Mykanów is a rural gmina (administrative district) in Częstochowa County, Silesian Voivodeship, in southern Poland.

Villages
Gmina Mykanów contains the villages and settlements of Adamów, Antoniów, Borowno, Borowno-Kolonia, Cykarzew Północny, Cykarzew Północny-Stacja, Czarny Las, Dudki, Florków, Grabowa, Grabówka, Jamno, Kokawa, Kolonia Wierzchowisko, Kuźnica Kiedrzyńska, Kuźnica Lechowa, Lemańsk, Łochynia, Lubojenka, Lubojna, Mykanów, Nowa Rybna, Nowy Broniszew, Nowy Kocin, Osiny, Pasieka, Przedkocin, Radostków, Radostków-Kolonia, Rusinów, Rybna, Stary Broniszew, Stary Cykarzew, Stary Cykarzew POM, Stary Kocin, Topolów, Tylin, Wierzchowisko, Wola Hankowska and Wola Kiedrzyńska.

Neighbouring gminas
Gmina Mykanów is bordered by the city of Częstochowa and by the gminas of Kłobuck, Kłomnice, Kruszyna, Miedźno, Nowa Brzeźnica and Rędziny.

Administration

Mayor
Dariusz Pomada (RiN) – since 2014

Mykanów Council

RiN - 4 seats, PSL - 3, PiS - 2, Other - 6

References

Gmina's election results

Mykanow
Częstochowa County